Spain originally planned to participate in the Eurovision Song Contest 2020 with the song "" written by Blas Cantó, Dan Hammond, Dangelo Ortega, Mikolaj Trybulec and Ashley Hicklin. The song was performed by Blas Cantó, who was internally selected by Spanish broadcaster  (TVE) to represent the nation at the 2020 contest in Rotterdam, Netherlands. Blas Cantó was announced as the Spanish representative on 5 October 2019, while "" was presented to the public as the Spanish entry on 30 January 2020.

As a member of the "Big Five", Spain automatically qualified to compete in the final of the Eurovision Song Contest. However, the contest was cancelled due to the COVID-19 pandemic.

Background 

The nation has won the contest on two occasions: in 1968 with the song "" performed by Massiel and in 1969 with the song "" performed by Salomé, the latter having won in a four-way tie with France, the Netherlands and the United Kingdom. Spain has also finished second four times, with Karina in 1971, Mocedades in 1973, Betty Missiego in 1979 and Anabel Conde in 1995. In 2019, Spain placed twenty-second with the song "" performed by Miki.

The Spanish national broadcaster,  (TVE), broadcasts the event within Spain and organises the selection process for the nation's entry. TVE confirmed their intentions to participate at the 2020 Eurovision Song Contest on 4 June 2019. In 2018 and 2019, TVE organised a national final through the reality television music competition , which featured a competition among several artists and songs. For their 2020 entry, the broadcaster opted to select both the artist and song via an internal selection.

Before Eurovision

Internal selection 
On 5 October 2019, TVE announced during the  news broadcast  that they had internally selected singer Blas Cantó to represent Spain in Rotterdam. Cantó previously attempted to represent Spain at the Eurovision Song Contest in 2011 where he performed as part of Auryn, placing second in the national final with the song "". Blas Cantó was selected as the Spanish entrant by a committee from six shortlisted candidates that were proposed by record labels, among them which also included Cristina Ramos, Diana Navarro, Lola Índigo and Ruth Lorenzo who represented Spain in the Eurovision Song Contest 2014, as reported by Spanish media.

On 22 January 2020, TVE revealed that Blas Cantó would sing the song "", written by Blas Cantó himself together with Dan Hammond, Dangelo Ortega, Mikolaj Trybulec and Ashley Hicklin. The official video of the song, directed by Cristian Velasco and filmed in Lanzarote and Tenerife, premiered on 30 January 2020 on RTVE's website. In regards to the song, Blas Cantó stated: " reflects a world similar to mine, with which the public can discover my evolution by listening to it. I think it is a roller coaster of emotions. Universo has a new and risky style for me but keep my essence [sic]".

Promotion 

At Eurovision 
The Eurovision Song Contest 2020 was expected to take place at Rotterdam Ahoy in Rotterdam, Netherlands and would have consisted of two semi-finals on 12 and 14 May and the final on 16 May 2020. According to Eurovision rules, all nations with the exceptions of the host country and the "Big Five" (France, Germany, Italy, Spain and the United Kingdom) were required to qualify from one of two semi-finals in order to compete for the final; the top ten countries from each semi-final progress to the final. As a member of the "Big 5", Spain automatically qualified to compete in the final. In addition to their participation in the final, Spain was also required to broadcast and vote in one of the two semi-finals. However, due to the COVID-19 pandemic, the contest was cancelled.

References

External links
 Official TVE Eurovision site

2020
Countries in the Eurovision Song Contest 2020
Eurovision
Eurovision